Guilty Giraffe are an American rock band from New York.

History
Guilty Giraffe started as a rock duo from Yonkers, New York that formed in 2015. Both members were self-taught musicians. They self-produced and released their debut album A Time to Slime in December 2015.  They have been classified as post-hardcore and shoegaze.  Guilty Giraffe made The A.V. Club's 2017 Year In Band Names list. In 2017, they signed to the independent record label Mint 400 Records.

Mint 400 Records
Their second album, Server Error. was released with Mint 400 Records on 9 May 2017.  Will Vellek joined Guilty Giraffe in the Winter of 2018 on bass, and they played as a three-piece for a while, until Reis quit Guilty Giraffe in Spring of 2018 to follow other musical endeavors. Guilty Giraffe rebuilt the line-up, adding Kevin Knebel on drums, and Shane Sumano on bass. For the Mint 400 Records compilation NJ / NY Mixtape, which features artists that performed at 2018 North Jersey Indie Rock Festival, Guilty Giraffe contributed the song "Off Ripped." They also released their third album Filtered in 2018, which was new versions of music written by Mat Mcginnis years prior.

Members
Mathew McGinnis – vocals and guitar (2015–present)
Will Vellek – bass (2018) and guitar (2018–present)
Shane Sumano – bass (2018–present)
Kevin Knebel – drums (2018–present)

Former members
Felipe Reis – drums (2015–2018)

Discography
Albums
A Time To Slime (2015)
Server Error (2017)
Filtered (2018)
Pacing (2021)

Singles
"Washed Out" (2017)
"Hungry Cats" (2018)
"Off Ripped" (2018)
"Filter" (2018)

Appearing on
NJ / NY Mixtape (2018)

References

Citations

Bibliography

External links

American musical duos
Mint 400 Records artists
Musical groups established in 2015
2015 establishments in New York (state)